Union of Cinema Production Workers was an autonomous (non-"charro"-led) Mexican trade union.  It was formed in 1944 after splitting off from the CTM-affiliated Union of Cinema Industry Workers (Sindicato de Trabajadores de la Industria Cinematográfica, (STIC)).  Mario Moreno "Cantinflas" served as its first secretary general.

References 

Entertainment industry unions
Trade unions in Mexico
Politics of Mexico

Trade unions established in 1944